The 1998 Atlantic Coast Conference men's basketball tournament took place from March 5–8 in Greensboro, North Carolina, at the Greensboro Coliseum. North Carolina won the tournament for the second year in a row, defeating Duke in the championship game.

The winner of this game received a bye into the semifinals. A second first-round game pitted the #7 seed versus the #8 seed. The winner of that game played the #2 seed in the quarterfinals.

Antawn Jamison of North Carolina was named tournament  MVP.

Bracket

AP rankings at time of tournament

Awards and honors

Everett Case Award

All Tournament Teams

First Team

Second Team

External links
 

Tournament
ACC men's basketball tournament
College sports tournaments in North Carolina
Basketball competitions in Greensboro, North Carolina
ACC men's basketball tournament
ACC men's basketball tournament